Robert Lawford Oakley (1921-1999) was an English speedway rider.

Speedway career 
Oakley was a leading speedway rider in the late 1950s. He reached the final of the Speedway World Championship in the 1952 Individual Speedway World Championship and went on to win the bronze medal.

He rode in the top tier of British Speedway, riding for Wembley Lions who he joined from Southampton Saints for £1,500 in July 1950.

World Final appearances
 1952 -  London, Wembley Stadium - 3rd - 12pts

Family
His brother Tom Oakley was also a speedway rider.

References 

1921 births
1999 deaths
British speedway riders
Wembley Lions riders
Southampton Saints riders
Norwich Stars riders